Korean ceramic history begins with the oldest earthenware from around 8000 BC.
Throughout the history, the Korean peninsula has been home to lively, innovative, and sophisticated art making. Long period of stability have allowed for the establishment of spiritual traditions, and artisan technologies specific to the region. Korean ceramics in Neolithic period have a unique geometric patterns of sunshine, or it's decorated with twists. In Southern part of Korea, Mumun pottery were popular. Mumun togi used specific minerals to make colors of red and black. Korean pottery developed a distinct style of its own, with its own shapes, such as the moon jar or Buncheong sagi which is a new form between earthenware and porcelain, white clay inlay celadon of Goryeo, and later styles like minimalism that represents Korean Joseon philosophers' idea. Many talented Korean potters were captured and brought to Japan during the invasions of Korea, where they heavily contributed to advancing Japanese pottery. Arita ware, founded by Yi Sam-pyeong opened a new era of porcelain in Japan. Another Japanese representative porcelain, Satsuma ware was also founded by Dang-gil Shim and Pyeong-ui Park. 14th generation of Su-kwan Shim have been using the same name to his grandfather and father to honor they are originally Korean, 14th Su-kwan Shim is honorable citizen of Namwon, Korea.

History

Jeulmun pottery period | Neolithic 

The earliest known Korean pottery dates back to around 8000 BC, and evidence of Mesolithic Pit–Comb Ware culture (or Yunggimun pottery) is found throughout the peninsula, such as in Jeju Island. Jeulmun pottery, or "comb-pattern pottery", is found after 7000 BC, and is concentrated at sites in west-central regions of the Korean Peninsula, where a number of prehistoric settlements, such as Amsa-dong, existed. 
Jeulmun pottery bears basic design and form similarities to that of Eurasian lands. The earliest pottery of this design is found in Korea.

Mumun pottery period | Bronze age 
The Mumun age starts around 3000 BC and lasts to 400 BC. Mumun pottery are often found in dolmens with Korean harp, bipa shaped bronze dagger and bronze tools around. Potteries of this period have flat bottoms and smooth surface, it has got the name Minmuneui, Mumun pottery. Ancient Joseon and Buyeo used them for ritualistic purposes as well as practical usage. As rice cultivation widely spread, practical jars with handles on both sides were developed, which is called Misongri Togi.

Samhan period 

Different gray colors and shapes of potteries baked at around 900 degree Celsius appears during Samhan period.
These potteries were initially called Gimhae pottery named after the discovered site, Gimhae. Many of them were inside shell midden near river.

Three kingdom period

Later Silla
Pottery of the Later Silla period (668–935) or Silla period had a unique goopdari stand stool designs like Gaya kingdom. In comparison to Gaya, they had more objects put on potteries, three dimensional. We can see Silla tried different things you can't find in East Asia through their objects. There are antlers, horns, horse motifs in stonewares, and they have left interesting objects like Roman soldier, Arabian, anteater and elephants. Because those animals don't live in Korea, we can assume they travelled very far.

Celadon subsequently became the main production.

Temples increased the demand for celadon-glazed wares (cheongja), causing cheongja celadon to evolve very quickly, with more organic shapes and decorations, such as animal and bird motifs. But the celadon do not have any relationships with Buddhism itself, there are jade gokok in the old Stone Age, Korea and jade necklaces in the neolithic age. The jade was valued as a treasure like we can witness many jade gokoks are hanging in Shilla's golden crown. Those jade gokok were symbol of creativity of the universe.

When making cheongja wares, a small amount of iron powder was added to the refined clay, which was then coated with a glaze and an additional small amount of iron powder, and then finally fired. This allowed the glaze to be more durable, with a shinier and glossier finish than white wares.

Goryeo

The Goryeo dynasty (918–1392) achieved the unification of the Later Three Kingdoms under Wang Geon. The works of this period are generally considered to be the finest works of ceramics in Korean history. Korean celadon reached its pinnacle with the invention of the sanggam inlay technique in the early 12th century.

Key-fret, foliate designs, geometric or scrolling flowerhead bands, elliptical panels, stylized fish, insects, birds and the use of incised designs began at this time. Glazes were usually various shades of celadon, with browned glazes to almost black glazes being used for stoneware and storage. Celadon glazes could be rendered almost transparent to show black and white inlays. Jinsa "underglaze red", a technique using copper oxide pigment to create copper-red designs, was developed in Korea during the 12th century, and later inspired the "underglaze red" ceramics of the Yuan dynasty.

While the forms generally seen are broad-shouldered jars, larger low jars or shallow smaller jars, highly decorated celadon cosmetic boxes, and small slip-inlaid cups, the Buddhist potteries also produced melon-shaped vases, chrysanthemum cups often of spectacularly architectural design on stands with lotus motifs and lotus flower heads. In-curving rimmed alms bowls have also been discovered similar to Korean metalware. Wine cups often had a tall foot which rested on dish-shaped stands.

Baekja wares came from highly refined white clay, glazed with feldspar, and fired in regulated and clean large kilns. Despite the refining process, white glazes invariably vary as a result of the properties of the clay itself; firing methods were not uniform, temperatures varied and glazes on pieces vary from pure white, in an almost snowy thickness, through milky white that shows the clay beneath deliberately in washed glaze, to light blue and light yellow patinas. After having succeeded the tradition of Goryeo baekja, soft white porcelain was produced in Joseon Dynasty, that carried on, but from the mid-Joseon on hard white porcelain became the mainstream porcelain.

The baekja wares reached their zenith immediately before the Joseon Dynasty came to power. Fine pieces have recently been found in the area around Wolchil Peak near Mount Kumgang. The transitional wares of white became expressions of the Joseon Dynasty celebrations of victory in many pieces decorated with Korean calligraphy. Traditionally white wares were used by both the scholarly Confucian class, the nobility and royalty on more formal occasions.

Joseon

During the Joseon dynasty, (1392–1897) ceramic wares were considered to represent the highest quality of achievement from royal, city, and provincial kilns, the last of which were export-driven wares. Joseon enjoyed a long period of growth in royal and provincial kilns, and much work of the highest quality still preserved.

Wares evolved along Chinese lines in terms of colour, shape, and technique. Celadon, white porcelain, and storage pottery were similar, but with certain variations in glazes, incision designs, florality, and weight. The Ming influence in blue and white wares using cobalt-blue glazes existed, but without the pthalo blue range, and the three-dimensional glassine colour depth of Ming Dynasty Chinese works.

Simplified designs emerged early on. Buddhist designs still prevailed in celadon wares: lotus flowers, and willow trees. The form most often seen was that of pear-shaped bottles. Notable were thinner glazes, and colourless glazes for buncheong or stoneware. During the Joseon period, Koreans applied the sanggam tradition to create buncheong ceramics. In contrast to the refined elegance of Goryeo celadon, buncheong is painted stoneware designed to be natural, unassuming, and practical. However, the buncheong tradition was gradually replaced by Joseon white porcelain, its aristocratic counterpart, and disappeared in Korea by the end of the 16th century. Buncheong became known and prized in Japan as Mishima.

Joseon white porcelain representing Joseon ceramics was produced throughout the entire period of the Joseon dynasty. The plain and austere white porcelain suitably reflects the taste of Neo-Confucian scholars. Qing colouring, brighter and almost Scythian in enamel imitation, was rejected by Korean potters, in favour of simpler, less decorated wares in keeping with a new dynasty that built itself on Confucian doctrine.

Generally, the ceramics of this dynasty is divided into early, middle, and late periods, changing every two centuries, approximately; thus 1300 to 1500 is the early period, 1500 to 1700 the middle, and 1700 to 1900–1910 the late period.

The wares began to assume more traditional Korean glazes and more specific designs to meet regional needs. This is to be expected, as the Scythian art influences were of the former dynasty. The rise of white porcelain occurred as a result of Confucian influence and ideals, resulting in purer, less pretentious forms lacking artifice and complexity.

In 1592 during the Japanese invasion of Korea, entire villages of Korean potters were forcibly relocated to Japan, damaging the pottery industry as craftsmen had to relearn techniques because the masters were gone.

20th century 
A revival of celadon pottery began in the early 20th century, including the work of Living National Treasure, Yu Geun-Hyeong, whose work was documented in the 1979 short film, Koryo Celadon.

More practical potteries were loved during this period, while big companies like Hankook porcelain, Haengnam porcelain occurred. Buncheong casual wares also revived and became widely popular since it match with modern-day eco minimal trend.

Types 

Goryeo Celadon

Goryeo was a golden era for porcelains. Goryeo celadon, Buncheong and even Baekje white porcelain appeared during this dynasty.

Even though, celadon first made during Baekje kingdom period 3rd to 4th century, in Goryeo it's applied to various forms and designs.

Buncheong

Beauty of Buncheong is naturalism. It was invented in the opposition to the perfection of celadon. Artisans reached new states by releasing the mind of making artworks, therefore we can feel it went to steps further to a higher level of consciousness. Buncheong was first made during 13 century of Goryeo dynasty although it became widely popular in Joseon dynasty period, 15C. The major consumers of celadon were nobles but buncheong was loved by common people.

Baekja, white porcelain

The characteristic of Korean white porcelain is simplicity, warmth and elegance coming from it. The warmth comes from the color and the shape, Korean Baekja, white porcelain typically has ivory colors with some other shades. Joseon dynasty was Seonbi philosophers or scholars' country, we can see how society affects trend of porcelains by time.

Onggi

Onggi (Korean: 옹기, 甕器) is Korean earthenware extensively used as pots and storage containers in Korea. It became a typical Korean garden material. It includes both unglazed earthenware, fired near 600 to 700°C, and pottery with a dark brown glaze fired at over 1100 °C. The origin of onggi dates to around 4000 to 5000 BC. The two types of earthenware include: patternless, mumun, and a red and black variety.

Exports 
It began export in Goryeo dynasty period(AD.918~1392) and Korea got their English name after the trade of Goryeo porcelains to the world. It was first introduced as Corée, it changed to Corea among English speakers. China also imported lots of Goryeo celadons. Exported Goryeo celadons are found in some countries in Europe, China, Japan, Thailand, Vietnam and Indonesia.

During Joseon dynasty, it started 'closing door policy' after winning attacks from France and the United States. Most exports during this period went to Japan, and most were from provincial coastal kilns, especially in the Busan area. Export occurred in two ways: either through trading or through invasion and theft of pottery and the abduction to Japan of families of potters who made the wares. The voluntary immigration of potters was improbable since Joseon pottery was administrated by the Ministry of Knowledge Economy (工曹) (:ko:공조 (행정기관)). As a national resource, pottery technician trade with foreign countries was prohibited.

Kilns
Central to Korean success were the chambered climbing kilns, based on the Chinese dragon kiln, that were used throughout the Joseon dynasty and exported abroad, especially to Japan by Korean kiln-makers where they were renamed as noborigama in the Karatsu area from the 17th century on.  Modern kilns are either electric or gas-fired.

Centers for studying Korean ceramics
Department of Ceramics at the College of Art and Design, Ewha Womans University in Seoul
Department of Ceramics at the College of Art and Design, Kongju National University in Gongju
Korea Ceramic Foundation (KOCEF)

See also
Korean art
List of Korean ceramic artists and sculptors
Ceramic art
Dragon jars (Korean)
Yunggimun
Celadon
A Single Shard, a novel by Linda Sue Park in which the main focus is Korean pottery.

Notes

References 

Goro Akaboshi, Five Centuries of Korean Ceramics, Weatherhill, 1975.

External links
 The Asian Art Museum, An excellent Korean ceramics collection
 The Art of Korean Potters Exhibit
 Korean History
 Over 120 pictures of Korean Pottery from the Freer Gallery
 Koryo dynasty
 Korean ceramics  Details of an exhibition at the Smithsonian Institution
 Comprehensive Archaeological Bibliography of Korean Pottery
 Talks on the Korean impact on Japanese ceramics (Archived 2009-10-31)
 Joseon Dragon vase (Archived 2009-10-31) with softer watery-blue glaze and naturalistic brush-strokes
 From the Fire: Contemporary Korean ceramics International Arts Ceramic Artists exhibition
 Mountain Dreams: Contemporary Ceramics by Yoon Kwang-cho — Philadelphia Museum of Art exhibition
Reviving the Korean Ceramics Tradition at the American Museum of Ceramic Art

Korean art
Porcelain